Fifty-three women have been appointed to positions in the Cabinet of the United Kingdom, with three female Prime Ministers serving in cabinet. Since, by convention, members of the cabinet must be a member of either the House of Commons or House of Lords, the Prime Minister could not appoint women to the cabinet until the Parliament (Qualification of Women) Act 1918 allowed women to stand for MP, and could not appoint peeresses to it until the Life Peerages Act 1958.

Female prime ministers
Three women have led the cabinet as prime minister.

 denotes the first female minister of that particular department.

Female cabinet members
 denotes the first female minister of that particular department.

Female ministers also attending cabinet
Some roles, such as the Attorney General, can attend cabinet meetings without being a member of the cabinet.

 denotes the first female minister of that particular department.

Notable members
Baroness Amos became the first black woman to be appointed to the cabinet in 2003. Justine Greening became the first lesbian member of the cabinet in 2011, although she was not openly lesbian until 2016.

References

United Kingdom
Lists of government ministers of the United Kingdom
Female members of the Cabinet of the United Kingdom